Pattersonville is an unincorporated community in Augusta Township, Carroll County, Ohio, United States.  The community is part of the Canton–Massillon Metropolitan Statistical Area. The community is serviced by the Minerva, Ohio post office, ZIP code 44657
.  It is located on the Still Fork creek and the Ohi-Rail Corporation (OHIC) railroad.

History
Pattersonville was platted November 15, 1907 by George S. Patterson in section 21 of township 15 in the fifth range.

Education
Students attend the Carrollton Exempted Village School District.

References

Unincorporated communities in Carroll County, Ohio
Unincorporated communities in Ohio